Culpo is a surname. Notable people with the surname include:

 Christopher Culpo, American-French composer and pianist
 Olivia Culpo (born 1992), American fashion influencer, beauty queen, actress, host and social media personality
 Vittorio Culpo (1904–1955), Italo-French resistance soldier